Sebastian Castro-Tello (born 14 March 1987) is a Swedish former professional football player of Chilean descent.

Career

Hammarby
He started his senior career at Hammarby Talang FF before signing his first professional contract, a four year-deal, with their parent club Hammarby IF in 2006. Castro-Tello made four appearances for the side in Allsvenskan during the same season.

In 2007, he put on impressive performances whilst playing 16 games and scoring 4 goals. In the off season, Castro-Tello was nominated to win the award as the newcomer of the year on the Swedish Fotbollsgalan. However, the price later went to Gefle IF's striker Johan Oremo.

He played another two full seasons in Allsvenskan as a starter for Hammarby, before the club got relegated to Superettan, the Swedish second tier, in 2009. During the same year Castro-Tello sparked some controversy as he allegedly featured in a non-professional game for another club, managed by some of his childhood friends. The claims from the opposing team where however never proven.

In 2010, he enjoyed a fruitful partnership with the striker Linus Hallenius in Superettan, scoring 8 goals for the club. He scored another 4 goals for the club in a successful run in Svenska Cupen, where Hammarby lost out on the gold medal after a loss in the final against Helsingborgs IF.

During the following seasons his performances declined. In late 2012, Hammarby unsuccessfully searched to terminate his contract following a series of reported misbehaviour.

Ravan Baku
In July 2013, Castro-Tello joined the Azerbaijan Premier League club Ravan Baku on a year long loan. On 10 August 2013, Castro-Tello made his debut for Ravan Baku at home in their 0–2 defeat against Neftchi Baku. Castro-Tello's first goal for Ravan came on 25 August 2013, in the club's 1–5 home defeat against Inter Baku.

In early October Castro-Tello returned to Sweden, whilst still under contract, after a dispute with Ravan over terms in his contract, which he felt where broken by the club. Castro-Tello's loan contract was cancelled in December.

Degerfors IF
Before the 2014 season, he signed a two-year deal with Degerfors IF in Superettan. He enjoyed a successful campaign at his new side, scoring 7 goals in 27 competitive games. However, Castro-Tello terminated his contract with the club by mutual consent in early 2015, citing homesickness as the main reason.

Decline and professional retirement
He then returned to his home town Stockholm, where he represented various teams in the lower leagues during 2015 and 2016, thus effectively ending his professional career.

Position 
Castro-Tello played as a striker during some games in 2008, but his standard position was attacking midfielder.

International career 
He made his debut for the Sweden national under-21 football team on 5 June 2007 against Switzerland national under-21 football team. In total, he won 11 caps and scored 3 goals for the U21s.

Professional career statistics

References

External links 
 

Swedish footballers
Swedish people of Chilean descent
Sportspeople of Chilean descent
Hammarby Talang FF players
Hammarby Fotboll players
1987 births
Living people
Footballers from Stockholm
Expatriate footballers in Azerbaijan
Ravan Baku FC players
Boo FK players
Association football forwards
Association football midfielders
Allsvenskan players
Superettan players
Swedish expatriate sportspeople in Azerbaijan